Barsha Patnaik  (née Nayak) is an Indian actress, born in Paradip, Odisha. She works in Odia cinema industry named Ollywood. Her debut film was Tulasi Apa. Debut film earned her success as she was awarded Best actress in 27th Odisha State Film Awards presented by the Government of Odisha.

Career
Barsha got her first film 'Tulasi Apa' directed by Amiya Patnaik after giving audition, while she was working for an IT Company in Hyderabad in 2015. The film is based on the life of social activist and Padma Shri awardee Tulasi Munda.'Tulasi Apa' was screened in International Film Festival of India (IFFI), 21st Kolkata International Film Festival, 8th Bengaluru International Film Festival, International Film Festival of Shimla (IFFS) and 8th Nasik International Film Festival in India and outside of India at Tehran Jasmine International Film Festival in Ramsar, Iran. But the film was released in theatres on 19 May 2017. This film has become the first Odia feature film to be featured on Amazon Prime World Wide.

Filmography

Accolades

References

External links

Actresses in Odia cinema
Actresses from Odisha
Indian film actresses
Year of birth missing (living people)
People from Jagatsinghpur district
Living people
21st-century Indian actresses